The qualification for the 2016 Men's Olympic Volleyball Tournament was held from 8 September 2015 to 5 June 2016. Twelve teams qualified, the hosts, the FIVB World Cup champions and runners-up, five continental Olympic qualification tournament champions and four teams from two World Olympic qualification tournaments. Teams already qualified for the event were not eligible to play in the following qualification tournaments.

Qualification summary

* The Asian Qualifier was combined with the 1st World Qualifier. The best Asian team qualified as the Asian Qualifier winners, while the best three ranked teams except the Asian Qualifier winners qualified as the top three teams of the 1st World Qualifier.

Means of qualification

Pool standing procedure

For all qualification tournaments except North and South American qualification tournaments

 Number of matches won
 Match points
 Sets ratio
 Points ratio
 Result of the last match between the tied teams

Match won 3–0 or 3–1: 3 match points for the winner, 0 match points for the loser
Match won 3–2: 2 match points for the winner, 1 match point for the loser

For North American qualification tournament only

 Number of matches won
 Match points
 Points ratio
 Sets ratio
 Result of the last match between the tied teams

Match won 3–0: 5 match points for the winner, 0 match points for the loser
Match won 3–1: 4 match points for the winner, 1 match point for the loser
Match won 3–2: 3 match points for the winner, 2 match points for the loser

For South American qualification tournament only

 Match points
 Sets ratio
 Points ratio
 Result of the last match between the tied teams

2 match points for the winner, 1 match point for the loser

Host country
FIVB reserved a vacancy for the 2016 Summer Olympics host country to participate in the tournament.

2015 World Cup

Venues: 
Dates: 8–23 September 2015
The top two teams qualified for the 2016 Summer Olympics.

Continental qualification tournaments

Africa

Venue:  Henri Elende Hall, Brazzaville, Congo
Dates: 7–12 January 2016
The winners qualified for the 2016 Summer Olympics. The second and third ranked teams qualified for the 2016 2nd World Olympic Qualification Tournament.

Asia and Oceania
The 2016 Asian Olympic Qualification Tournament combined with 2016 1st World Olympic Qualification Tournament. The hosts Japan and the top three ranked teams except Japan from the FIVB World Ranking as of October 2015 competed in the tournament. The top ranked among the four teams qualified for the 2016 Summer Olympics as the 2016 Asian Olympic Qualification Tournament winners.

Europe

The hosts Germany and the top seven ranked teams from the CEV European Ranking as of 19 October 2015 which had not yet qualified to the 2016 Summer Olympics competed in the 2016 European Olympic Qualification Tournament.

Venue:  Max-Schmeling-Halle, Berlin, Germany
Dates: 5–10 January 2016
The winners qualified for the 2016 Summer Olympics. The second and third ranked teams qualified for the 2016 1st World Olympic Qualification Tournament.

North America
The top four teams from the 2015 NORCECA Championship competed in the 2016 North American Olympic Qualification Tournament.

Venue:  Saville Community Sports Centre, Edmonton, Canada
Dates: 8–10 January 2016
All times are Mountain Standard Time (UTC−07:00).
The winners qualified for the 2016 Summer Olympics. The runners-up qualified for the 2016 1st World Olympic Qualification Tournament, whereas the third ranked team qualified for the 2016 2nd World Olympic Qualification Tournament.

South America
Venue:  Domo José María Vargas, Maiquetía, Venezuela
Dates: 9–11 October 2015
All times are Venezuelan Standard Time (UTC–04:30).
The winners qualified for the 2016 Summer Olympics. The runners-up qualified for the 2016 1st World Olympic Qualification Tournament, whereas the third ranked team qualified for the 2016 2nd World Olympic Qualification Tournament.

World qualification tournaments
There were 2 tournaments to get 5 remaining spots in the 2016 Summer Olympics. Only the teams which had not yet qualified from the 3 events above played in the tournaments. 12 teams had rights to play in the tournaments, Japan as the hosts of the 1st tournament, the top three Asian teams except Japan from the FIVB World Ranking as of October 2015 and the second and third ranked teams from continental qualification tournaments. The 1st tournament was combined with the 2016 Asian Olympic qualification tournament which played in Japan. The best ranked Asian team qualified for the 2016 Summer Olympics. The best three ranked teams, excluding the best Asian team, also secured the vacancies in the 2016 Summer Olympics. The 2nd tournament which was held in Mexico consisted of 4 teams, and only the best ranked team took the last spot for the 2016 Summer Olympics. The table below showed the allocation of 12 qualified teams.

1st tournament
Venue:  Tokyo Metropolitan Gymnasium, Tokyo, Japan
Dates: 28 May – 5 June 2016
All times are Japan Standard Time (UTC+09:00).

2nd tournament
Venue:  Gimnasio Olímpico Juan de la Barrera, Mexico City, Mexico
Dates: 3–5 June 2016
All times are Central Daylight Time (UTC−05:00).

See also
Volleyball at the 2016 Summer Olympics – Women's qualification

References

External links
Qualification system
Qualification process
Official website of the 2016 African Olympic Qualification Tournament
Official website of the 2016 European Olympic Qualification Tournament
Official website of the 2016 North American Olympic Qualification Tournament
Official website of the 2016 South American Olympic Qualification Tournament
Official website of the 2016 1st World Olympic Qualification Tournament
Official website of the 2016 2nd World Olympic Qualification Tournament

Olympic Qualification Men
Olympic Qualification Men

2016